Frank Smith was a member of the Florida House of Representatives in the sessions of 1869 and 1870 and also served as Clerk of the Court for Brevard County. He operated a store and post office at Fort Pierce which, at the time, was the only settlement for 37 miles north of Jupiter.

Smith was the first settler of Micco, Florida in 1877. His residence near the old Indian River Inlet supports the belief that the area of the original Indian River Colony, Susannah, near Fort Pierce, was Brevard's early county seat.

See also 
 List of members of the Florida House of Representatives from Brevard County, Florida

References 

County judges in the United States
Florida pioneers
Florida postmasters
Members of the Florida House of Representatives
People from Brevard County, Florida
People from Fort Pierce, Florida
Year of birth missing
Year of death missing